The 2017–18 ACB season, also known as Liga Endesa for sponsorship reasons, was the 35th season of the Spanish basketball league. It started on 29 September 2017 with the first round of the regular season and ended on 19 June 2018 with the finals.

Valencia Basket was the defending champion, but was defeated in quarterfinals by Herbalife Gran Canaria, who achieved qualification to the EuroLeague for the first time ever, but was defeated in semifinals by Real Madrid who won their 34th title after defeating Kirolbet Baskonia in finals.

Teams

Promotion and relegation (pre-season)
A total of 18 teams contested the league, including 16 sides from the 2016–17 season and two promoted from the 2016–17 LEB Oro. This include the top team from the LEB Oro, and the winners of the LEB Oro playoffs.

As of 10 July 2017, the ACB, forced by the statement of the National Commission for Markets and Competence (CNMC), agreed with the Spanish Basketball Federation and endorsed by the CSD to reduce the requirements to fulfill by the promoted teams for playing in the league. On August 11, 2017, the ACB proceeded to the precautionary and provisional registration of the Real Betis Energía Plus, in application of the precautionary measures issued by the judicial demand of the Andalusian club.

Teams promoted from LEB Oro
Delteco GBC
San Pablo Burgos

Teams relegated to LEB Oro
Real Betis Energía Plus
ICL Manresa

Venues and locations

Personnel and sponsorship

Notes
1. Cultura del Esfuerzo is the motto of the club.

Managerial changes

Regular season

League table

Positions by round
The table lists the positions of teams after completion of each round. In order to preserve chronological evolvements, any postponed matches are not included in the round at which they were originally scheduled, but added to the full round they were played immediately afterwards. For example, if a match is scheduled for round 13, but then postponed and played between rounds 16 and 17, it will be added to the standings for round 16.
Source: ACB

Results

Playoffs

Final standings

Attendances
Attendances include playoff games:

Awards
All official awards of the 2017–18 ACB season.

MVP

Source:

Finals MVP

Source:

All-ACB Teams

Source:

Best Young Player Award

Source:

Best All-Young Team

Source:

El Corte Inglés Top Scorer

Source:

KIA Most Spectacular Player

Source:

Best Coach

Source:

Player of the round

Source:

Player of the month

Source:

ACB clubs in European competitions

References and notes

External links
 Official website 

 
ACB
Spanish
Liga ACB seasons